Sir Wilson James Whineray  (10 July 1935 – 22 October 2012) was a New Zealand business executive and rugby union player. He was the longest-serving captain of the national rugby union team, the All Blacks, until surpassed by Richie McCaw in 2014. Rugby writer Terry McLean considered him the All Blacks' greatest captain.

Domestic career
Owing to his early career as an agricultural cadet, which involved considerable travel around the country, Whineray played for six first-class teams, including Wairarapa, Mid Canterbury, Manawatu, Canterbury, Waikato, and finally his hometown team, Auckland, for whom he made 61 appearances between 1959 and 1966. He also played for the South Island, North Island, and New Zealand Universities sides.

International career
He first played for the All Blacks in 1957. The following year he became captain for the 1958 series against Australia at the young age of 23. He went on to play 77 matches for the All Blacks between 1957 and 1965, 67 of them as captain. These included 32 test matches, all but two of them as captain. He played mostly in the position of prop. Whineray was appointed an Officer of the Order of the British Empire (OBE), for services to sport, especially to rugby football, in the 1962 New Year Honours, and he was named New Zealand Sportsperson of the Year in 1965.

Later life
After retiring from rugby, he gained a MBA from Harvard University, where he was a member of the Harvard Business School RFC. He returned to New Zealand in 1969 and started work at Alex Harvey Industries, which became Carter Holt Harvey. He rose to become deputy managing director, then chairman of the board of Carter Holt Harvey, by then a major New Zealand company, and retired from the board in 2003. He was the managing director of NZ Wool Marketing Corporation in 1973–74, chairman of the National Bank of New Zealand, and a director of Auckland International Airport and APN News & Media.

He was chairman of the Hillary Commission, a sports funding body, from 1993 to 1998. He was the honorary Colonel Commandant of the New Zealand Special Air Service from 1997 to 2001.

In the 1998 Queen's Birthday Honours, Whineray was appointed a Knight Companion of the New Zealand Order of Merit (KNZM), for services to sport and business management. In 2003, he was inducted into the New Zealand Business Hall of Fame.

In November 2004, it was reported that Whineray was a top contender to replace Dame Silvia Cartwright as Governor-General in 2006. Bob Howitt has said that, "had he allowed his name to go forward, he would have become the Governor-General". He became the first New Zealander inducted into the IRB Hall of Fame, being elected on 21 October 2007 (following the IRB World Cup in France) after a public vote.

Whineray died in Auckland in 2012, at the age of 77. He was buried at Purewa Cemetery in the Auckland suburb of Meadowbank.

All Blacks statistics
Tests: 32 (30 as captain)
Games: 45 (37 as captain)
Total matches: 77 (67 as captain)
Test points: 6 (2 tries)
Game points: 18 (5 tries, 1 dropped goal)
Total points: 24 (7 tries, 1 dropped goal)

References

Further reading
 Howitt, Bob (2010). A perfect gentleman : Sir Wilson Whineray. Auckland : Harper Collins New Zealand.

1935 births
2012 deaths
New Zealand international rugby union players
Rugby union props
Auckland rugby union players
Canterbury rugby union players
Waikato rugby union players
Manawatu rugby union players
World Rugby Hall of Fame inductees
Harvard Business School alumni
University of Auckland alumni
People educated at Auckland Grammar School
Rugby players and officials awarded knighthoods
Rugby union players from Auckland
New Zealand Officers of the Order of the British Empire
Knights Companion of the New Zealand Order of Merit
Businesspeople awarded knighthoods
Burials at Purewa Cemetery